Triple E may refer to:

 Maersk Triple E class, a class of container ship
 Embrace, extend and extinguish, business tactic used by Microsoft
 Triple-E Senate (elected, effective, equal), a proposal for senate reform in Canada
 Triple E Recreational Vehicles, Canadian RV company
 Eastern equine encephalitis virus (Triple E)
  Education, Ethics, and Entertainment (Triple E + Engagement) proposed by Robert L. Selman

Other uses
 EEE (disambiguation)
 3E (disambiguation)
 E3 (disambiguation)
 IEEE (usually pronounced "I triple E")